Pullimaan is a 1972 Indian Malayalam-language film, directed by E. N. Balakrishnan and produced by Ponnappan. The film stars Madhu, Devika, Vijayanirmala and Alummoodan. It is based on the short story of the same name by S. K. Pottakkad.

Plot

Cast 

Madhu
Devika
Vijayanirmala
Alummoodan
Kaduvakulam Antony
Kottarakkara Sreedharan Nair
Master Raghu
Philomina

Soundtrack 
The music was composed by M. S. Baburaj with lyrics by Sreekumaran Thampi.

References

External links 
 

1970s Malayalam-language films
1972 films
Films based on short fiction